Grand Jacques is the début album by Belgian singer-songwriter Jacques Brel.

History
The original album, titled Jacques Brel et ses chansons, was released in March 1954 as a nine-song 10-inch LP by Philips Records (N 76.027 R). The original nine tracks were recorded on 15 February 1954 at Théâtre de l'Apollo in Paris. A later reissue of the album under the title Jacques Brel 1 was released by Barclay and included additional tracks from 1953, 1955, 1956, and 1961. The album was reissued on 23 September 2003 under the title Grand Jacques as part of the 16-CD box set Boîte à bonbons by Barclay (980 816-3).

Critical reception
In her review for AllMusic, Amy Hanson called the album a "marvelous disc" and a "masterful collection of songs recorded ... at the beginning of Brel's storied career, and a glimpse into a style of chanson that he seldom returned to once he'd swept France, Europe, and then the States with his best-known classics just a couple years later". Hanson continued:

Track listing

Personnel
 Jacques Brel – vocals, acoustic guitar
 André Grassi – arrangements 
 Glen Powell – arrangements 
 Michel Legrand – orchestra conductor 
 André Popp – orchestra conductor 
 François Rauber – orchestra conductor 
 Jean-Marie Guérin – mastering
 Henri Guilbaud – photography

References

1954 debut albums
Albums conducted by André Popp
Albums conducted by François Rauber
Albums conducted by Michel Legrand
Barclay (record label) albums
French-language albums
Jacques Brel albums
Philips Records albums